Prolacerta is a genus of archosauromorph from the lower Triassic of South Africa and Antarctica. The only known species is Prolacerta broomi. The generic name Prolacerta is derived from Latin meaning “before lizard” and its species name broomi is in commemoration of the famous paleontologist Robert Broom, who discovered and studied many of the fossils found in rocks of the Karoo Supergroup. When first discovered, Prolacerta was considered to be ancestral to modern lizards, scientifically known as lacertilians. However, a study by Gow (1975) instead found that it shared more similarities with the lineage that would lead to archosaurs such as crocodilians and dinosaurs (including birds). Prolacerta is considered by modern paleontologists to be among the closest relatives of the Archosauriformes.

History of discovery
Prolacerta was first described by Francis Rex Parrington in 1935 from a single skull recovered near the small town, Middelburg, in the Eastern Cape of South Africa. The fossil was recovered from an exposure of rock from the Katberg Formation in the Lystrosaurus Assemblage Zone. At the time, Parrington described the first Prolacerta fossil, the early evolutionary relationships of archosaurs was even more poorly understood than they are currently.  Due to its small size and lizard-like appearance, Parrington subsequently placed Prolacerta between basal younginids and modern lizards. Parrington's classification of Prolacerta was accepted for several decades, including by the paleontologist Charles Lewis Camp who conducted further research on Prolacerta. It was only after more Prolacerta fossils were found that more in depth research was undertaken on this animal. In the 1970s the close link between Prolacerta and crown archosaurs was first hypothesized, which lead to numerous phylogenetic analyses being conducted on Prolacerta and other stem archosaurs from the 1980s onwards.

Description

Prolacerta were small reptiles that lived during the Induan and Olenekian stages of the lower Triassic. Prolacerta is arguably the most well-represented stem-archosauriform, with numerous well preserved specimens housed in various research institutions in South Africa, Europe, and in the United States. With the skull of adult specimens ranging between 8 – 10 cm in length, Prolacerta were considered to have been small, lizard-like animals. However, several cranial and postcranial features set Prolacerta apart from lizards and instead show that it is an early relative of crown-archosaurs. Some of these notable features include elongated cervical vertebrae with elongate, thickened neural spines, which gave Prolacerta a slightly elongated neck and a wide range of flexibility. Cranial features include thecodont teeth, a feature observed in all ancestors of crown archosaurs, which were pointed and caniniform in shape.

Prolacerta was probably a small, active, terrestrial carnivore or insectivore due to its fang-like teeth of roughly the same size and shape. Prolacerta is considered to have been a quadruped, although due to its hind limbs being larger and longer than its front limbs, there is a possibility that it was habitually bipedal during high activity. It has been hypothesized that Prolacerta was capable of cranial kinesis, although research into this possible feature of Prolacerta remains inconclusive.

Classification
Initially hypothesized to be ancestral to lizards, Prolacerta was later identified as an archosauromorph by Gow (1975). Gow placed it into a group known as the Prolacertiformes, which also contained "protorosaurs" such as Protorosaurus, Macrocnemus, and the long-necked tanystropheids. Macrocnemus and a few other "prolacertiforms" were allied with Prolacerta in the family Prolacertidae. However, later studies starting with Dilkes (1998) have split apart the concept of Prolacertiformes, with protorosaurs being placed near the base of Archosauromorpha and Prolacerta being much closer to Archosauriformes. Prolacertidae was also split by this reassessment, with Macrocnemus now considered a tanystropheid. Currently, Prolacertidae is restricted to Prolacerta and its close Australian cousin Kadimakara. Prolacertids are confidently considered to be archosauromorphs within the clade Crocopoda, along with the allokotosaurs, rhynchosaurs, and archosauriforms.

The following cladogram is based on a large analysis of archosauriforms published by M.D. Ezcurra in 2016

References

Prehistoric archosauromorphs
Prehistoric reptile genera
Induan genera
Olenekian genera
Early Triassic reptiles of Africa
Triassic South Africa
Fossils of South Africa
Prehistoric reptiles of Antarctica
Triassic Antarctica
Fossils of Antarctica
Fossil taxa described in 1935
Taxa named by Francis Rex Parrington